Sky Holdings Corporation d/b/a Sky Cana is an airline with ACMI contracted operators headquartered in Santo Domingo. It started scheduled services to Caribbean and the United States from its two hubs: Las Américas International Airport and Cibao International Airport. The services offered are transfer, freight, overflight, helicopter, advertising, air ambulance, and tour services. The airline of the Dominican Republic has started flights from New York-JFK to Santiago de los Caballeros and Santo Domingo with two flights daily.

History
In 2016, LogicPaq received its AOC from the Dominican Republic's civil aviation authority and planned to offer regular and charter flights between the Dominican Republic to Colombia, Mexico and United States for and on behalf of tour operators. Its first aircraft, an Airbus A321, was delivered on 28 November 2020.

Mid-January 2021, Sky Cana was the 1st airline in the Americas to offer flights to nowhere,<ref>https://www.arecoa.com/videos/2021/01/18/hito-sky-cana-primer-vuelo-sin-destino-rd/ Flight to Nowhere''</ref> a type of flights in which people board an aircraft for a nominal fee, and it flies around the city for about an hour before returning to the airport of origin, allowing fliers to sight-see in their own city from the air.

Final of January 2021, Sky Cana was designated by the Dominican Professional Baseball League "LIDOM'''" to operate the flight for the National Champion Baseball Team 2021 Águilas Cibaeñas to Mazatlán, Mexico. representing the Dominican Republic in 2021 Caribbean Series.

Destinations
As of September 2021, Sky Cana gradually [??] in a period of three years while having all the flights in charter as well. The CEO of the company, Frank Diaz, states that the airline plans to have three major hubs while receiving many seasonal flights in major touristic cities such as Punta Cana.

As of June 2022, Sky Cana operates the following destinations:

Fleet

Current fleet

As of March 2023, the Sky Cana fleet consists of the following aircraft:

Former fleet
Sky Cana previously operated the following aircraft:

See also
List of airlines of the Dominican Republic

References

External links

Official Website Sky Cana Airlines
Air Charter Guide
Dominican today: Sky Cana receive the 1st A321, Page retrieved 29 November 2020
News In America: Sky Cana receive the 1st A321, Page retrieved 5 Dicember 2020
Arecoa: Inician Vuelos Punta Cana a Medellin, Colombia, Page retrieved 2 April 2021

2014 establishments in the Dominican Republic
Airlines established in 2014
Airlines of the Dominican Republic